Appendage is Circa Survive's second EP. It was released on November 30, 2010 through Atlantic Records. It contains b-sides from the Blue Sky Noise sessions, as well as a demo of "Sleep Underground". As with Circa Survive's previous three albums and EP, Esao Andrews created the artwork.

Track listing
All tracks by Circa Survive

References

2010 EPs
Circa Survive albums
Atlantic Records EPs
Albums produced by David Bottrill